Yanaccacca (possibly from Quechua yana black, qaqa rock, "black rock") is a mountain in the Andes of Peru which reaches a height of approximately . It is located in the Moquegua Region, General Sánchez Cerro Province, on the border of the districts of Matalaque and Ubinas. Yanaccacca lies southeast of the active Ubinas volcano.

References

Mountains of Peru
Mountains of Moquegua Region